Deepa Madhukar Marathe (born 25 November 1972) is an Indian former cricketer who played as a right-handed batter and slow left-arm orthodox bowler. She appeared in five Test matches and 59 One Day Internationals for India between 1997 and 2005. She played domestic cricket for Air India and Railways.

References

External links
 
 

Living people
1972 births
Cricketers from Maharashtra
Indian women cricketers
India women Test cricketers
India women One Day International cricketers
Air India women cricketers
Railways women cricketers